The 2014–15 Eintracht Braunschweig season is the 121st season in the club's football history. In 2014–15 the club plays in the 2. Bundesliga, the second tier of German football. It is the club's first season in this league since having been relegated from the Bundesliga in 2014.

Review and events

The 2014–15 season of Eintracht Braunschweig began on 16 June with their first training session.

The draw for the first round of the 2014–15 DFB-Pokal happened on 1 June and paired Braunschweig with Bremen-Liga team Bremer SV.

On 12 July 2014, the team headed for a week-long pre-season training camp in Leogang, Salzburg, Austria.

The draw for the second round of the DFB-Pokal happened on 23 August and paired Braunschweig with Regionalliga Bayern team Würzburger Kickers.

On 16 January 2015, the team headed for a week-long winter training camp in Jerez de la Frontera, Andalusia, Spain.

Matches and results

Legend

Friendly matches

2. Bundesliga

League fixtures and results

League table

DFB-Pokal

Squad

Current squad

Transfers

Summer

In:

Out:

Winter

In:

Out:

Management and coaching staff 

Since 12 May 2008 Torsten Lieberknecht is the manager of Eintracht Braunschweig.

Reserve team 

Eintracht Braunschweig II plays in the fourth-tier Regionalliga Nord for the 2014–15 season.

Current squad

Staff

References

External links 
Eintracht Braunschweig Official Website

Eintracht Braunschweig seasons
Eintracht Braunschweig season 2014-15